The Lowell Holly Reservation is a  nature reserve in Mashpee and Sandwich, Massachusetts and is managed by the Trustees of Reservations. The area was extensively planted by Abbot Lawrence Lowell and Wilfred Wheeler with rhododendrons, mountain laurel and holly trees, for which the reservation gets its name. Abbot Lawrence Lowell bequeathed the property to the Trustees of Reservations in 1943.

References

External links 
 The Trustees of Reservations: Lowell Holly Reservation
 Trail map 

The Trustees of Reservations
Open space reserves of Massachusetts
Protected areas of Barnstable County, Massachusetts
1943 establishments in Massachusetts
Protected areas established in 1943